Baku is a village development committee (VDC) in Solukhumbu District in the Sagarmatha Zone of north-eastern Nepal. Baku lies in the  Himalaya, 59 km South of Mount Everest and is bordered by the valleys of Dudh Kosi River (West) and Hinku Drangka River (East). At the time of the 1991 Nepal census it had a population of 4159 people living in 777 individual households. At the time of the 2011 census, the population of the VDC Baku was 4844 inhabitants (2380 male) in 963 individual households.

Villages and hamlets 
Baku consists of several settlements and hamlets. 
The most important ones are:
 Baku (1,600 m )
 Sibuje (2,520 m )

References

External links
UN map of the municipalities of Solukhumbu District

Populated places in Solukhumbu District